The Serpent's Tooth is a 1917 American silent drama film starring Gail Kane from the stage and released through the Mutual Film company. It is a lost film.

Cast
 Gail Kane as Faith Channing
 William Conklin as James Winthrop
 Edward Peil, Sr. as Jack Stilling
 Jane Pascal as Hortense Filliard
 Frederick Vroom as Matthew Addison-Brown
 Mary Wise as Mrs. Addison-Brown (Mary Lee Wise)
 Charles P. Kellogg as Carrington
 Gayne Whitman as Sid Lennox (* as Al Vosburgh)

Reception
Like many American films of the time, The Serpent's Tooth was subject to cuts by city and state film censorship boards. The Chicago Board of Censors, because of the plot involving drug use, gave the film an "adults only" permit and required cuts in Reel 1 of the first view of a woman in a low cut gown and two closer views of the same; in Reel 3 of the intertitle "You make her use it. Its grounds for divorce in this state." and the shot of man putting drug into the woman's medicine; in Reel 4 of the intertitle "You say you couldn't get any more. I have been more successful."; and in Reel 5 of the intertitles "Your damned lover is a liar." and "It's the drug that loves you - the drug I've fed her night and day," and the scene of the choking of the wife and knocking her down.

References

External links
 
 
 

1917 films
American silent feature films
Lost American films
1917 drama films
Silent American drama films
American black-and-white films
American Film Company films
1917 lost films
Lost drama films
Films directed by Rollin S. Sturgeon
1910s American films